Christian Baya (born August 27, 1991) is a German-born Dutch-Angolan kickboxer who is the former Glory Lightweight Championship title challenger. 

He ranked in the world's lightweight top 10 by Combat Press in 2017 and 2018.

Early years
Born in Germany but resident in the Netherlands from a young age, Baya often fights under the flag of Angola which is his mother's home country.

Professional kickboxing career
After his Glory debut win over Josh Jauncey, Baya participated in the Glory Lightweight contender tournament. In the semi finals he won a split decision over Anatoly Moiseev, and in the finals he likewise won a split decision over Massaro Glunder.

Winning this tournament earned a title shot against the incumbent lightweight champion Sitthichai Sitsongpeenong. Baya lost the title fight by a unanimous decision.

During Glory 49: Rotterdam Baya fought Samo Petje, winning the fight by TKO in the first round, after just 26 seconds.

After his failed title bid, he fought a rematch with Josh Jauncey. Baya would lose the fight by a split decision, which began a four fight split decision losing streak. He lost split decisions to Tyjani Beztati during Glory 59, Marat Grigorian during Glory 62, and Khayal Dzhaniev during SAS Gym 02.

Baya snapped a five fight losing streak during Fair Fight IX, when he won a decision, after an extra round was fought, against Vadim Vaskov.

In late 2019, Baya challenged for the Fair Fight 70 kg title, held at the time by Alexander Skvortsov. He lost the fight by a unanimous decision.

Baya was scheduled to face Amansio Paraschiv at GFC 7: Romania vs. Netherlands II for the GFC Intercontinental Light Middleweight Championship. He lost the bout by split decision.

Championships and accomplishments
 2017 Glory Lightweight Contender Tournament Winner
 2015 SHOOTBOXING Super Lightweight Tournament Runner-up
 2014 KOK World Grand Prix Winner
 2014 Suthaibo World Champion (won at the Machine is back event)
 2013 KOK Qualification Tournament Winner

Fight record 

|-
|-  bgcolor="#FFBBBB"
| 2023-03-18 || Loss ||align=left| Ouyang Feng || Wu Lin Feng 535: China vs Netherlands || Tangshan, China || Decision (Unanimous) || 3 || 3:00

|-
|-  bgcolor="#FFBBBB"
| 2022-09-10 || Loss ||align=left| Khambakhadov Saifullah || Mix Fight Championship || Baku, Azerbaijan || Decision (Unanimous) || 3 || 3:00  
|-
|-  bgcolor="#FFBBBB"
| 2021-12-11 || Loss ||align=left| Vlad Tuinov || Mix Fight Championship: Fight Club, Semi Finals || Frankfurt, Germany || Decision || 3 || 3:00  
|-  bgcolor="#FFBBBB"
| 2021-06-24 || Loss ||align=left| Amansio Paraschiv || GFC 7: Romania vs. Netherlands II || Bucharest, Romania || Decision (Split) || 3 || 3:00  
|-
! style=background:white colspan=9 | 
|- 
|-  bgcolor="#FFBBBB"
| 2019-10-26 || Loss||align=left| Alexander Skvortsov || Fair Fight X || Yekaterinburg, Russia || Decision (Unanimous)|| 5 || 3:00
|-
! style=background:white colspan=9 |
|-  bgcolor="#CCFFCC"
| 2019-07-08 || Win ||align=left| Vadim Vaskov || Fair Fight IX || Yekaterinburg, Russia || Extra Round Decision || 4 || 3:00
|-  bgcolor="#FFBBBB"
| 2019-06-13 || Loss ||align=left| Khayal Dzhaniev || SAS Gym 02, Semi Final || Bucharest, Romania || Decision (split) || 3 || 3:00
|-  bgcolor="#FFBBBB"
| 2018-12-08 || Loss ||align=left| Marat Grigorian  || Glory 62: Rotterdam || Netherlands || Decision (Split) || 3 || 3:00
|-  bgcolor= "#FFBBBB"
| 2018-09-29|| Loss ||align=left| Tyjani Beztati || Glory 59: Amsterdam || Amsterdam, Netherlands || Decision (Split) || 3 || 3:00
|-  style="background:#FFBBBB"
| 2018-06-02 || Loss ||align=left| Josh Jauncey || Glory 54: Birmingham || Birmingham, England  || Decision (Split) || 3 || 3:00
|- style="background:#FFBBBB;"
| 2018-02-16 || Loss || align="left| Sitthichai Sitsongpeenong || Glory 50:Chicago || Chicago, United States ||Decision (unanimous) || 5 || 3:00
|-
! style=background:white colspan=9 |
|-  style="background:#CCFFCC"
| 2017-12-09 || Win ||align=left| Samo Petje || Glory 49: Rotterdam  || Rotterdam, Netherlands || TKO || 1 || 1:26
|- style="background:#CCFFCC;"
| 2017-06-10 || Win ||align=left| Massaro Glunder || Glory 42: Paris Lightweight Contender Tournament, Final || Paris, France || Decision (split) || 3 || 3:00
|-
! style=background:white colspan=9 |
|-  bgcolor="#CCFFCC"
| 2017-06-10 || Win ||align=left| Anatoly Moiseev || Glory 42: Paris - Lightweight Contender Tournament, Semi Finals  || Paris, France || Decision (split) || 3 || 3:00
|-  style="background:#CCFFCC;"
| 2016-11-05 || Win ||align=left| Josh Jauncey || Glory 35: Nice || Nice, France || Decision (Majority) || 3 || 3:00
|-  style="background:#FFBBBB;"
| 2016-03-19 || Loss ||align=left| Ben Hodge || Yokkao 17 & 18 || Bolton, United Kingdom || Decision || 5 || 3:00
|-  style="background:#FFBBBB;"
| 2016-01-30 || Loss ||align=left| Chingiz Allazov || Thai Boxe Mania 2016 || Italy || Decision || 3 || 3:00
|-  style="background:#CCFFCC;"
| 2015-11-21 || Win  ||align=left| Mo Bennasser || Bari Gym Kickboks Event || Netherlands || Decision || 3 || 3:00
|- 
|-  bgcolor="#FFBBBB"
| 2015-08-22|| Loss||align=left| Hiroaki Suzuki || SHOOT BOXING 30th Anniversary “CAESAR TIME!” Super Lightweight World Tournament, Final || Tokyo, Japan || Decision || 3 || 3:00
|- 
|-  bgcolor="#CCFFCC"
| 2015-08-22|| Win ||align=left| Tapruwan Hadesworkout || SHOOT BOXING 30th Anniversary “CAESAR TIME!” Super Lightweight World Tournament, Semi Final || Tokyo, Japan || KO (Right Hook) || 4 || 0:37
|-  style="background:#CCFFCC;"
| 2015-04-19 || Win  ||align=left| Brahim Kallah || The Best of all Elements || Netherlands || Decision || 3 || 3:00
|-  style="background:#CCFFCC;"
| 2015-04-11 || Win  ||align=left| Sorgraw Petchyindee || Choc des Mondes || France || KO || 4 ||
|-  style="background:#CCFFCC;"
| 2014-12-28 || Win  ||align=left| Malic Groenberg || The Machine Is Back || Paramaribo, Suriname || KO ||  ||
|-  style="background:#CCFFCC;"
| 2014-11-28 || Win ||align=left| Mateusz Kopiec || KOK WORLD GP 2014 IN PLOCK, Final || Poland || Decision (Extra round) || 3 || 3:00 
|-
! style=background:white colspan=9 |
|-  style="background:#CCFFCC;"
| 2014-11-28 || Win ||align=left| Robert Rajewski || KOK WORLD GP 2014 IN PLOCK, Semi Finals || Poland || Decision || 3 || 3:00
|-  style="background:#CCFFCC;"
| 2014-08-30 || Win  ||align=left| Greg Wooton || Nak Muay series 3 || England || KO || 1 ||
|-  style="background:#CCFFCC;"
| 2014-06-07 || Win  ||align=left| Hamza Rahmani || Le Choc des Mondes || France || KO ||  ||
|-  style="background:#CCFFCC;"
| 2014-05-03 || Win ||align=left| Leo Bonniger || High Lights || Germany || Decision || 3 || 3:00
|-  style="background:#FFBBBB;"
| 2014-03-15 || Loss ||align=left| Tadas Jonkus || KOK WORLD GP 2014 in VILNIUS, Final || Lithuania || Decision || 3 || 3:00
|-  style="background:#CCFFCC;"
| 2014-03-15 || Win ||align=left| Cristian Dorel || KOK WORLD GP 2014 in VILNIUS, Semi Finals || Lithuania || TKO || 2 || 2:10
|-  style="background:#CCFFCC;"
| 2014-03-15 || Win ||align=left| Karol Lada || KOK WORLD GP 2014 in VILNIUS, Quarter Finals || Lithuania || Decision || 3 || 3:00
|-  style="background:#CCFFCC;"
| 2014-02-08 || Win ||align=left| Giga Chikadze || Fight Fans VIII || Netherlands || Decision || 3 || 3:00
|-  style="background:#FFBBBB;"
| 2013-12-22 || Loss ||align=left| Roman Mailov || W5 GRAND PRIX MOSCOW || Moscow, Russia || Decision || 3 || 3:00
|-  style="background:#CCFFCC;"
| 2013-11-23 || Win ||align=left| Andrii Panov || KOK World GP 2013, Qualification Tournament, Final || Germany || TKO || 3 ||
|-
! style=background:white colspan=9 |
|-  style="background:#CCFFCC;"
| 2013-11-23 || Win ||align=left| Max Baumert || KOK World GP 2013, Qualification Tournament, Semi Finals || Germany || TKO || 2 ||
|-  style="background:#CCFFCC;"
| 2013-11-23 || Win ||align=left| Alex Vogel || KOK World GP 2013, Qualification Tournament, Quarter Finals || Germany || KO || 1 ||
|-  style="background:#CCFFCC;"
| 2013-09-07 || Win ||align=left| Mohamed El Messaoudi || Kickboksgala Dangerzone || Netherlands || Decision || 5 || 3:00
|-  style="background:#CCFFCC;"
| 2013-08-03 || Win ||align=left| Robbie Hageman || Beat Down || Paramaribo, Suriname || ||  ||
|-  style="background:#c5d2ea;"
| 2013-06-01 || Draw ||align=left| Cedric Manhoef || Fight Fans V || Amsterdam, Netherlands || Decision || 3 || 3:00
|-  style="background:#CCFFCC;"
| 2013-03-24 || Win||align=left| Kevin Miruka || Muay Thai and MMA event North vs The Rest || Netherlands || Decision || 3 || 3:00  
|-
| colspan=9 | Legend:

See also
 List of male kickboxers

References

1991 births
Living people
Lightweight kickboxers
Glory kickboxers 
Dutch male kickboxers
Angolan male kickboxers
German male kickboxers
German people of Angolan descent
German expatriate sportspeople in the Netherlands